These Were The Earlies is the debut studio album by The Earlies, released in 2004 in the UK before releasing in the US the year later.

Reception
These Were the Earlies received positive reviews from critics. On Metacritic, the album holds a score of 84/100 based on 15 reviews, indicating "universal acclaim."

Track listing
Lyrics: Brandon Carr/John-Mark Lapham. Music: Brandon Carr/Giles T. Hatton/John Mark-Lapham/Christian Madden. 
"In the Beginning..." – 0:26
"One of Us Is Dead" – 5:56
"Wayward Song" – 6:16
"Slow Man's Dream" – 4:49
"25 Easy Pieces" – 4:51
"Morning Wonder" – 5:34
"The Devil's Country" – 5:50
"Song for #3" – 4:15
"Lows" – 4:46
"Bring It Back Again" – 5:31
"Dead Birds" – 2:48

References

2004 debut albums
The Earlies albums
Secretly Canadian albums